This list of the Mesozoic life of Arkansas contains the various prehistoric life-forms whose fossilized remains have been reported from within the US state of Arkansas and are between 252.17 and 66 million years of age.

A

 †Acutostrea
 †Acutostrea plumosa
 †Aechmella
 †Aechmella ozanensis – type locality for species
 Alderina
 †Alderina inuber – type locality for species
 †Ambigostrea
 †Ambigostrea tecticosta
 †Anchura
  †Anomia
 †Anomia argentaria
 †Anomia texana
 †Aphrodina
 †Aphrodina tippana
 †Atreta

B

  †Baculites
 †Baculites crickmayi
 †Baculites ovatus
 †Baculites reduncus
 †Baculites taylorensis
 †Baculites undatus
 †Bellifusus
 †Bellifusus spinosus
 Botula
 †Botula conchafodentis
  †Brontopodus
 †Brontopodus birdi
 †Buccinopsis
 †Buccinopsis solida

C

 Cadulus
 †Cadulus obnutus
 Caestocorbula
 †Caestocorbula crassaplica
 †Caestocorbula crassiplica
 †Camptonectes
 †Camptonectes bubonis
 †Cardiaster
 †Cardiaster deciper – type locality for species
  Caryophyllia
 †Caryophyllia konincki
 †Castanopora
 †Castanopora spooneri
 †Chedighaii – type locality for genus
 †Chedighaii barberi – type locality for species
 †Cheethamia – type locality for genus
 †Cheethamia howei – type locality for species
 †Cirroceras
 †Cirroceras conradi
 †Classopollis
 †Classostrobus
 †Classostrobus arkansensis
  Cliona
 Corbicula
 †Corbicula arkansensis
 Crassatella
 †Crassatella vadosa
 †Crenella
 †Crenella serica
  Cucullaea
 †Cucullaea capax
 Cylichna
 †Cymella
 †Cymella bella
 †Cyprimeria
 †Cyprimeria alta
 †Cyprimeria coonensis

D

 †Dentalium
 †Dentalium leve
 †Desmophyllites
 †Desmophyllites diphylloides
 †Dhondtichlamys
 †Dhondtichlamys venustus
 †Diacanthopora
 †Diacanthopora langi – type locality for species
 †Didymoceras
 †Didymoceras binodosum
 †Didymoceras clardyi
 †Didymoceras cochleatum
 †Didymoceras donezianum
 †Didymoceras draconis
 †Didymoceras mortoni
 †Didymoceras platycostatum
 †Didymoceras tortum
 †Dionella
 †Dionella racemata – type locality for species
 †Dionella vivistratensis – type locality for species
  †Discoscaphites
 †Discoscaphites conradi
  †Douvilleiceras

E

 †Echinocorys
 †Echinocorys texanus
 Ellisina
 †Ellisina saratogaensis – type locality for species
 †Escharoides – tentative report
 †Escharoides danei – type locality for species
 †Escharoides erymnos – type locality for species
  †Eutrephoceras
  †Exogyra
 †Exogyra costata
 †Exogyra ponderosa

F

 †Flemingostrea
 †Flemingostrea subspatula
 †Frurionella
 †Frurionella parvipora

G

  †Gaudryceras
 †Granocardium
 †Granocardium bowenae
 †Granocardium tholi
 †Gryphaeostrea
 †Gryphaeostrea vomer

H

 Hemiaster
 †Hemiaster humphreysanus
 †Hemiaster wetherbyi
 †Heminautilus
 †Heminautilus stantoni – type locality for species
  †Hoploscaphites
 †Hoploscaphites pumilis

I

  †Inoceramus
 †Isomicraster
 †Isomicraster danei – type locality for species

J

  †Jeletzkytes
 †Jeletzkytes nodosus

L

 †Lewyites
 †Lewyites oronensis
 Limatula
 †Limatula acutilineata
 †Linthia
 †Linthia variabilis

M

 Malletia
 †Malletia longfrons
 †Malletia longifrons
 †Mathilda
 †Mathilda ripleyana – or unidentified related form
  †Menuites
 †Menuites portlocki – or unidentified comparable form
 †Micrabacia
 †Micrabacia arkansasensis – type locality for species
  †Micraster
 †Micraster americanus
 Micropora – tentative report

N

 †Naomichelys
 †Neancyloceras
 †Neancyloceras bipunctatum – or unidentified comparable form
  †Nostoceras
 †Nostoceras approximans
 †Nostoceras archiacianum
 †Nostoceras arkansanum
 †Nostoceras colubriformis
 †Nostoceras helicinus
 †Nostoceras hyatti
 †Nostoceras multituberculatum
 †Nostoceras pauper
 †Nostoceras plerucostatum
 †Nostoceras pulcher
 Nuculana
 †Nuculana whitfieldi

O

 †Oxybeloceras
 †Oxybeloceras crassum

P

  †Pachydiscus
 †Pachydiscus arkansanus
 Panopea
 †Panopea subplicata
 †Placenticeras
   †Platecarpus
 †Pleuriocardia
 †Prionochelys – type locality for genus
 †Prionochelys nauta – type locality for species
 †Protocardia
 †Protocardia spillmani
 †Pseudofrenelopsis
 †Pseudofrenelopsis parceramosa
 †Pseudokossmaticeras
 †Pseudokossmaticeras galicianum
 †Pseudophyllites
 †Pseudosaynella
 †Pseudosaynella fimbriata – type locality for species
 †Pseudosaynella walcotti
 †Pteria
 †Pterotrigonia
 †Pterotrigonia thoracica
 Pulvinites
 †Pulvinites argenteus
 Pycnodonte
 †Pycnodonte vesiculare
 †Pycnodonte vesicularis
 †Pyropsis

R

 Ramphonotus
 †Ramphonotus pedunculatus – type locality for species

S

 Serpula
 †Solenoceras
 †Solenoceras texanum – or unidentified comparable form
 †Solenophragma
 †Solenophragma elongatum – type locality for species
 †Solenophragma ovatum
  †Sphenodiscus
  Spondylus
 †Stictostega – type locality for genus
 †Stictostega durhami – type locality for species
 Striarca
 †Striaticostatum
 †Stylina
 †Stylina arkansasensis – type locality for species
 †Syncyclonema
 †Syncyclonema simplicius
 †Syncyclonema travisanus

T

 †Tenea
 †Tenea parilis
 †Thamnasteria
 †Thamnasteria imlayi – type locality for species
  †Toxochelys – type locality for genus
 †Toxochelys latiremis – type locality for species
 Trachycardium
 †Trachyscaphites
 †Trachyscaphites redbirdensis
 †Tricephalopora
 †Tricephalopora arkansasensis – type locality for species
 †Tricephalopora larwoodi – type locality for species
 Turritella
 †Turritella bilira
 †Turritella trilira

U

 †Uhligella – tentative report

V

 †Veniella
 †Veniella conradi

Z

 Zangerlchelys
 †Zangerlchelys arkansaw – type locality for species

References
 

Mesozoic
Arkansas